Composite Software, Inc. was previously a privately held data virtualization software company based in San Mateo, California. Composite Software was founded in October 2001 by Michael R. Abbott. In 2003, former Active Software founder and webMethods CTO, Jim Green joined Composite Software as CEO. On July 30, 2013, Composite Software was acquired by Cisco Systems for approximately US $180 million. Then on October 5, 2017 TIBCO purchased what was Composite Software from Cisco.

Composite Software was cited as an "industry leader" in the Forrester Research "2012 Forrester Wave: Data Virtualization" study for its help in advancing data virtualization to its current form, known under a variety of names including data federation and Information as a Service.

Composite Data Virtualization Platform

The Composite Data Virtualization Platform is data virtualization middleware that "brings together data from multiple, disparate sources—anywhere across the extended enterprise—into a unified, logical virtualized data layer for consumption by nearly any front-end business solution including portals, reports, applications and more."

The Composite Data Virtualization Platform consists of:
Composite Studio, which includes an integrated development environment for source data introspection, relationship discovery, data modeling, view and data service development, and revision control;
Composite Information Server, which includes a query engine with patent-pending query optimization technology, caching, data access, data publishing, data quality, security, data governance and a metadata repository;
Composite PerformancePlus Adapters for Greenplum, Hadoop/Hive, HP Vertica, IBM DB2, IBM Informix, IBM Netezza, Microsoft Access, Microsoft Excel, Microsoft SQL Server, Oracle Database, Oracle MySQL, SAP Sybase, SAP Sybase IQ and Teradata;
Composite Discovery for location of key entities and reveal hidden data relationships within enterprise data assets;
Composite Active Cluster for scalability that maintains continuous availability of data services to fulfill service level agreements;
Composite Monitor to provide comprehensive coverage in a real-time view for both systems management and data governance.

Customers

Composite Software's data virtualization software is used in financial services companies, pharmaceutical companies, energy companies, communications, consumer and industrial companies, and government agencies including the U.S. Army and the Environmental Protection Agency.

Post-Acquisition Development at Cisco
Composite Software was incorporated into Cisco as the Data Virtualization Business Unit. The Composite Data Virtualization Platform was renamed Cisco Data Virtualization, and Composite Information Server (CIS) became Cisco Information Server (CIS). It continues to be sold to address the same use cases at large enterprise customers, and is also central to Cisco's move into data and analytics  associated with the Internet of Things.

Post-Acquisition Development at TIBCO
In October 2017, TIBCO bought the Composite Software division of Cisco. Shortly after the transfer was completed TIBCO Data Virtualization 7.0.6 was released which updated the branding and changed the license model.

References

 Software companies based in California
 Cisco Systems acquisitions
 Software companies of the United States